Tom Richard Goegebuer (born 27 March 1975) is a former Belgian weightlifter competing in the 62 kg and 56 kg category. He is 164 cm tall (5 ft 5 inches)

Career
He competed in Weightlifting at the 2008 Summer Olympics in the 56 kg division finishing thirteenth with 251 kg. This improved his own Belgian record by 1 kg. In the 62 kg category, he participated in several Senior World Championships: 1997 Thailand, 1998 Finland, 1999 Greece, 2001 Turkey, 2005 Qatar, 2006 Dominican Republic, and 2007 Thailand.

Since 1999 he competed in all the European Senior Championships. At the 2008 European Championships he won overall silver in the 56 kg category, with a total of 244 kg.

At the 2009 European Championships he won overall gold in the 56 kg category, with a total of 252 kg.

At the 2010 European Championships he came only 2 kg short of the European title -56 kg with a new Belgian record of 254 kg total. With 116 kg snatch and 138 kg clean & jerk he came 3rd.

At the 2012 Summer Olympics, he finished 12th with a total of 247 kg.

National records

Notes and references

External links
 
 
 
 
  (archive)

1975 births
Living people
Weightlifters at the 2008 Summer Olympics
Weightlifters at the 2012 Summer Olympics
Weightlifters at the 2016 Summer Olympics
Olympic weightlifters of Belgium
Belgian male weightlifters
European Weightlifting Championships medalists
20th-century Belgian people
21st-century Belgian people